The second season of The Real Housewives of New York City, an American reality television series, is broadcast on Bravo. It aired February 17, 2009 until May 28, 2009, and is primarily filmed in New York City, New York. Its executive producers are Andrew Hoegl, Barrie Bernstein, Lisa Shannon, Pam Healy and Andy Cohen.

The Real Housewives of New York City focuses on the lives of Bethenny Frankel, LuAnn de Lesseps, Alex McCord, Ramona Singer, Jill Zarin and Kelly Killoren Bensimon. It consisted of 15 episodes.

Production and crew
The first season was such a success for the network, averaging 1.13 total million viewers during its airing The Real Housewives of New York City was renewed for a second season.
In July, 2008 filming for season two had begun and in January, 2009 the cast, trailer and premier date were announced.

The season premiere "There's a New Girl in Town" was aired on February 17, 2009, while the twelfth episode "Charity Wives" served as the season finale, and was aired on May 5, 2009. It was followed by a two-part reunion that aired on May 12 and May 14, 2009 and a "Lost Footage" episode on May 28, 2009, which marked the conclusion of the season.
Andrew Hoegl, Barrie Bernstein, Lisa Shannon, Pam Healy and Andy Cohen are recognized as the series' executive producers; it is produced by Ricochet and is distributed by Shed Media.

Cast and synopsis
All five wives from the first season returned for the second instalment. Season two introduced new wife, Kelly Killoren Bensimon. Bensimon is designer, model, author and fashion editor and is described as a "staple on the Manhattan social scene."

Bensimon covers a party for her work, where she gets treated VIP. Bensimon competes in the Hamptons Classic, a horse show that is a Grand Prix event. Bensimon continues to work as she covers fashion week for her Page Six magazine column and goes shopping with LuAnn de Lesseps to find an outfit for the Malo fashion show.
Bethenny Frankel confides in Jill Zarin about her break-up with Jason and bonds with Zarin's mother over the woes. Frankel becomes a cover girl, after shooting a photo shoot for Social Life magazine, but it isn't received well by de Lesseps- which doesn't go unnoticed. Frankel attempts clear the air with de Lesseps but the Countess doesn't take kindly to Frankel's criticism. During fashion week at the Jill Stuart show Frankel is seated next to Bensimon and tension between the two begins. The two meet to sort out their differences but it soon takes a turn for the worse when the claws come out. Frankel focuses on her brand SkinnyGirl when she seeks Alex McCord's assistance in designing a logo. Furthering her brand Frankel heads to Connecticut to promote her line of baked goods, Bethenny Bakes.
Le Lesseps is honored by The American Cancer Society where Frankel and Zarin attend in support. De Lesseps begins to get ready to send her daughter off to boarding school which includes telling the other housewives. De Lesseps continues to teach others about class and etiquette which inspires her book  Class with the Countess.
Ramona Singer's husband sets up a tennis match with Zarin, designed to be a rematch and a disagreement ensues about who Zarin's partner should be. Zarin's plans for a professional partner get turned down. Singer focuses on her business endeavors by developing a skin-care line and working on a demo reel for her jewelry line that will be sold on HSN.
Zarin begins the season having drama with and her husband because of interview Zarin gave to the New York Post. Zarin renovates her home with the help of her friends Brad. She later gets involved with the charity Creaky Joints and goes to several meetings. During one of the meeting where some of the other wives attend, Bensimon rubs everyone up the wrong way.
McCord and her husband spend time together in their Hamptons rental and St. Barts while their home is renovated. The McCords celebrate the final stages of the renovation by inviting everyone over for a party but old grievances soon arise.
Throughout the season, McCord's husband Simon finds himself continuously arguing with Singer. Matters between Simon and Singer worsen when tennis becomes the topic of conversation as well as Zarin being his tennis partner.

Episodes

References

External links

 

2009 American television seasons
New York City (season 2)